Bloemhof Dam is a dam in South Africa. It was originally known as the Oppermansdrif Dam when under construction during the late 1960s. It is located at the confluence of the Vaal River and the Vet River, on the border between the provinces North West and Free State. The dam wall has a total length of  The reservoir is very shallow, and therefore needs a large area to mean anything for water storage. The area around the reservoir (dam), has been a protected area, but because it lies on the border between provinces, these became two separate nature reserves. On the North West Province side lies the Bloemhof Dam Nature Reserve, on the Free State side is the Sandveld Nature Reserve.

The town of Bloemhof lies on the north west side of the Vaal River.

It is fed with the outflow from the Vaal Dam (located upstream in Gauteng) as well as rain collected in the Vaal, Vet, Vals and Sand River catchment areas.

Fishing
Bloemhof Dam is a world-renowned fishing destination for carp and catfish. It is one of the most frequently visited dams for angling events.

See also 
 List of reservoirs and dams in South Africa
 List of rivers of South Africa

References

Dams in South Africa
Vaal River
Dams completed in 1970
1970 establishments in South Africa